Moseyevo is a rural locality (a village) and the administrative center of Moseyevskoye Rural Settlement of Mezensky District, Arkhangelsk Oblast, Russia. The population was 71 as of 2010.

Geography 
Moseyevo is located on the Pyoza River, 68 km east of Mezen (the district's administrative centre) by road. Kalino is the nearest rural locality.

References 

Rural localities in Mezensky District